The Lech (Licca) is a river in Austria and Germany.
It flows in a north-north-easterly direction and crosses the German border, forming the Lechfall, a  waterfall; afterwards the river enters a narrow gorge (the Lechschlucht). The river runs through the city of Füssen and through the Forggensee, a man-made lake which is drained in winter. Here, it forms rapids and a waterfall.

It is not navigable, owing to its torrential character and the gravel beds which choke its channel. There are extensive views of the Lech valley from Neuschwanstein Castle, near Füssen.

Etymology
Inscriptions from 8/7 B. C. prove that the river name is first mentioned in the Celtic tribe name Licates. The river itself is called Likios or Likias in the 2nd century. Around the year 570 the name Licca is found in records. In the 8th century, names such as Lecha and Lech appeared. The term Licus is still used in 1059.

The name stands in analogy to the Welsh word llech ("stone slab") and the Breton word lec'h ("gravestone"). In this context, the meaning of the word "Lech" is explained as "the stony".

History 
On more than one occasion, historic events have been decided on the banks of this river.

 In 278 Roman emperor Probus vanquished a larger invasion force of Burgundians and Vandals, which had been raiding the Roman province of Rhaetia.
 At Lechfeld, a stony plain between the Lech and the Wertach near Augsburg, Otto I defeated the Magyars in August 955.
 In the Battle of Rain in April 1632, Gustavus Adolphus of Sweden defeated and mortally wounded Johan Tzerclaes, Count of Tilly.

Hydroelectric power plants 
Currently, there are 33 hydroelectric power plants on the Lech. The power plants are listed beginning at the headwaters:

Gallery

See also 
List of rivers of Bavaria
List of rivers of Austria

References 
 Eberhard Pfeuffer: Der Lech. Wissner-Verlag, Augsburg 2010, .
 R. Zettl: Lechauf-lechab. Wißner-Verlag 2002, .
 Dr. Peter Nowotny: Erlebnis Lech. Verlag – J. Eberl KG, Immenstadt 2001.
 Dr. Bernhard Raster: Nutzung und anthropogene Veränderung des Lechs in historischer Zeit. Diss. Würzburg 1979.
 Bayerisches Hauptstaatsarchiv (Hrsg.): Altbayerische Flusslandschaften an Donau, Lech, Isar und Inn. = Ausstellungskatalog, Anton H. Konrad, Verlag Weißenhorn 1998.
 Werner Gamerith: Lechtal. Tyrolia Verlag, Innsbruck-Wien 2002.
 Peter Nasemann: Lebensraum Füssener Lech. Holdenrieds Druck- und Verlags GmbH, o. J.
 Norbert Müller: Augsburger Ökologische Schriften, Heft 2: Der Lech. Stadt Augsburg 1991, 

Specific

External links 

 
 The Lech in Füssen
 Hochwassernachrichtendienst Bayern Alle möglichen Daten über die bayerischen Flüsse: aktuelle Pegelstände, langjährige Abflussdaten, Einzugsgebiet, etc.
 Life-Naturschutzprojekt Tiroler Lech
 Lebensraum Lechtal
 Bericht über eine Kajaktour

 
Rivers of Bavaria
Rivers of Tyrol (state)
Rivers of Vorarlberg
International rivers of Europe
Braided rivers in Europe
Rivers of Austria
Rivers of Germany